Thomas Knyvett, 7th Baron Berners (1655 or 1656 – 28 September 1693) was an English peer and Tory politician.

The son of Sir John Knyvett and Mary Bedingfield, he was baptised in Darsham in Suffolk in February 1655 or 1656. In 1673, Knyvett succeeded his father de jure as Baron Berners. He was Member of Parliament (MP) for Dunwich from 1685 to 1687 and for Eye from 1689 to 1690.

Knyvett died unmarried and was buried in Ashwellthorpe in Norfolk on 30 September 1693. With his death the barony fell into abeyance, but was terminated in 1711 in favour of his sister Katherine Bokenham.

References

1650s births
1693 deaths
Tory MPs (pre-1834)
English MPs 1685–1687
English MPs 1689–1690
Thomas
7